

This is a list of the National Register of Historic Places listings in Claiborne County, Mississippi.

This is intended to be a complete list of the properties and districts on the National Register of Historic Places in Claiborne County, Mississippi, United States. Latitude and longitude coordinates are provided for many National Register properties and districts; these locations may be seen together in a map.

There are 36 properties and districts listed on the National Register in the county, including 2 National Historic Landmarks.  Another two properties were once listed but have been removed.

Current listings

|}

Former listing

|}

See also

 List of National Historic Landmarks in Mississippi
 National Register of Historic Places listings in Mississippi

References

Claiborne County